The Conserved oligomeric Golgi complex (COG) is a multiprotein complex found in the Golgi apparatus structure and involved in intracellular transport and glycoprotein modification.

Earlier names for this complex were : the Golgi transport complex (GTC), the LDLC complex, which is involved in glycosylation reactions, and the SEC34 complex, which is involved in vesicular transport. These 3 complexes are identical and have been termed the conserved oligomeric Golgi (COG) complex (Ungar et al., 2002).[supplied by OMIM]

Structure
The COG protein complex consists of eight subunits, in two lobes; Lobe A consists of COG1, COG2, COG3, COG4 and lobe B consists of COG5, COG6, COG7, COG8.

Function
The conserved oligomeric Golgi complex plays important roles in maintaining the structure and transport mechanisms within the Golgi apparatus.

Further reading
 Role of the conserved oligomeric Golgi (COG) complex in protein glycosylation. Smith & Lupashin. 2008
 The conserved oligomeric Golgi complex is required for fucosylation of N-glycans in Caenorhabditis elegans. 2012 See Introduction

References

Protein complexes